Amy Varle CF (born  1986) is an entrepreneur from the Greater Manchester town of Bury, working to improve the access of people who are homeless to housing.

After a period of employment in a housing role for local government, in 2013 Amy founded People's Property Shop, a business which helps people to find and rent their own homes.

In 2016, Amy was awarded a travelling fellowship from the Winston Churchill Memorial Trust, in partnership with the National Housing Federation. As a result, she was able to research and in January 2018 publish the research report Social Property Investment : Pioneering strategies for 21st century homelessness prevention and response, which on 25 January 2018 she presented to Prime Minister Theresa May.

Early life and experience of homelessness 
Varle was made homeless at the age of 16 as a result of family issues. She lived, for ten months, in a hostel for young people, before being found a council flat. Her experience led Varle to work in a housing and homelessness role in local government.

People's Property Shop 
In 2013 Varle set up the business People's Property Shop, with the help of a £4,000 grant from the government Start Up Loans Scheme, based on her own experiences working in local government housing departments. She described the rationale behind the business as one of bridging the gap between people in housing need and landlords with properties to rent:

"“I realised that renting from private landlords was often not an option for people on benefits because letting agents were wary of slow payments and the paperwork involved. What People’s Property Shop does is support both parties to make the relationship work smoothly. We understand the issues facing both landlords and prospective tenants and can match them according to need.”

Winston Churchill Memorial Trust Fellowship 
In 2016, Varle became a Fellow of the Winston Churchill Memorial Trust. The fellowship enabled her to travel to the United States, visiting innovative housing and homelessness projects such as Project Homeless Connect and Lava Mae in San Francisco, and Breaking Ground in New York.

Research 
Varle's experiences on her fellowship travels formed the basis of a research report,Social Property Investment : Pioneering strategies for 21st century homelessness prevention and response, published in January 2018 with the support of the Winston Churchill Memorial Trust and the National Housing Federation. She was invited to 10 Downing Street to present her report to Prime Minister Theresa May after her corporate sponsor, Susan Dolan of SEO Web Marketing spoke directly to the PM about her Fellowship Report.

'Housing First' model 
As a result of her research, Varle has become an advocate for the 'Housing First' model for tackling homelessness - which combines the provision of stable housing with specialised support and empowers the individual to access the services they need, with regular visits from support workers. There is evidence that the Housing First approach has helped to reduce homelessness in countries across Europe such as Finland, where it is said to have "effectively ended homelessness. In February 2018, the UK Government announced £28 million in funding for Housing-First projects across three cities of the UK. Varle will lead the creation of a flagship centre for homeless people in Manchester as part of one of these projects.

See also 

 Homelessness
 Winston Churchill Memorial Trust
 Housing First

References

1980s births
Living people
Businesspeople from Manchester
British women in business
British activists
British women activists
Women human rights activists